The 1955–56 Marshall Thundering Herd men's basketball team represented Marshall College (now Marshall University) during the 1955–56 NCAA men's basketball season. The Thundering Herd, led by first-year head coach Jule Rivlin, played their home games at the Veterans Memorial Fieldhouse as members of the Mid-American Conference. They finished the season 18–5, 10–2 in MAC play to finish in first place. For the first time in school history, they received the MAC's automatic bid to the NCAA tournament where they lost to Morehead State in the First Round.

The season also marked the first time in the program's history that the Thundering Herd were ranked in the AP Poll during the season, coming in at No. 18 on the week of January 31.

Roster

Schedule/results

|-
!colspan=8| Regular Season
|-

|-
!colspan=8| NCAA tournament

References

Marshall Thundering Herd men's basketball seasons
Marshall
Marshall
Marshall Thundering Herd basketball (men's)
Marshall Thundering Herd basketball (men's)